Kornet is a settlement in the municipality of Podgorica, Montenegro.

It is the birthplace of Mardarije Uskoković, a saint in the Serbian Orthodox Church.

Demographics
According to the 2011 census, its population was 59.

Notable people
 Mardarije Kornečanin
 Mardarije Uskoković

References

Populated places in Podgorica Municipality